The Sinden Theatre is located within the grounds of Homewood School in the heart of the Weald in Tenterden, Kent, England. It was opened in 2004 and is named after its patron, the actor and former local resident, the late Sir Donald Sinden CBE.

The theatre was converted from an existing school hall at the time when Homewood was granted Arts College status in 2003 which enabled funding for conversion to a 231-seat theatrical venue to be carried out.

The theatre is used for the school's own productions, local amateur dramatic groups and also as a commercial theatre hosting visiting performers.

The theatre also allows various charities to hold fund-raising events on a no-fee basis.

The school can provide restaurant facilities in the theatre to serve meals and drinks at some productions.

References

External links

Theatres in Kent
Tenterden